Dawn Chorus is the second studio album by Canadian electronic musician Jacques Greene. It was released on October 18, 2019 by LuckyMe.

Critical reception

Dawn Chorus was met with "universal acclaim" reviews from critics. At Metacritic, which assigns a weighted average rating out of 100 to reviews from mainstream publications, this release received an average score of 82, based on 6 reviews.

Track listing
Track listing and credits adapted from Apple Music and Tidal.

Notes
 "Drop Location" features co-production from Clams Casino.
 "Night Service" features vocals by Cadence Weapon.
 "Let Go" features vocals by Rochelle Jordan and co-production from Machinedrum.
 "Stars" features vocals by Sandrine Somé and Cadence Weapon.

References

2019 albums
LuckyMe (record label) albums